Burton Leon Reynolds Jr. (February 11, 1936 – September 6, 2018) was an American actor, considered a sex symbol and icon of 1970s American popular culture.

Reynolds first rose to prominence when he starred in television series such as Gunsmoke (1962–1965), Hawk (1966) and Dan August (1970–1971). Although Reynolds had leading roles in such films as Navajo Joe (1966) and 100 Rifles (1969), his breakthrough role was as Lewis Medlock in Deliverance (1972). Reynolds played the leading role – often a lovable rogue – in a number of subsequent box office hits, such as White Lightning (1973), The Longest Yard (1974), Smokey and the Bandit (1977) (which started a six-year box office reign), Semi-Tough (1977), The End (1978), Hooper (1978), Starting Over (1979), Smokey and the Bandit II (1980), The Cannonball Run (1981), Sharky's Machine (1981), The Best Little Whorehouse in Texas (1982), and Cannonball Run II (1984), several of which he directed himself. He was nominated twice for the Golden Globe Award for Best Actor – Motion Picture Musical or Comedy.

Reynolds was voted the world's number one box-office star from 1978 to 1982 in the annual Top Ten Money Making Stars Poll, a record he shares with Bing Crosby. After a number of box-office failures, Reynolds returned to television, starring in the sitcom Evening Shade (1990–1994), which won him a Golden Globe Award and Primetime Emmy Award for Outstanding Lead Actor in a Comedy Series. His performance as high-minded pornographer Jack Horner in Paul Thomas Anderson's Boogie Nights (1997) brought him renewed critical attention, earning him another Golden Globe (for Best Supporting Actor – Motion Picture), with nominations for an Academy Award for Best Supporting Actor and a BAFTA Award for Best Supporting Actor.

Early life
Burton Leon Reynolds Jr. was born on February 11, 1936, to Harriet Fernette "Fern" (née Miller) and Burton Milo Reynolds (1906–2002). His family descended from Dutch, English, Scots-Irish, and Scottish ancestry. Reynolds also claimed Cherokee and Italian roots.

During his career, Reynolds often claimed to have been born in Waycross, Georgia, although in 2015, he stated that he was actually born in Lansing, Michigan. In his autobiography, he stated that Lansing is where his family lived when his father was drafted into the United States Army.

Reynolds, his mother, and his sister joined his father at Fort Leonard Wood, Missouri, where they subsequently lived for two years. When his father was sent to Europe, the family moved to Lake City, Michigan, where his mother had been raised. In 1946, the family moved to Riviera Beach, Florida. Reynolds' father eventually became Chief of Police of Riviera Beach, which is adjacent to the north end of West Palm Beach, Florida.

During 10th grade at Palm Beach High School, Reynolds was named First Team All State and All Southern as a fullback, and received multiple scholarship offers.

College
After graduating from Palm Beach High School, he attended Florida State University on a football scholarship and played halfback, starting in 1954. While at Florida State, he roomed with future college-football coach, broadcaster, and analyst Lee Corso, and also became a brother of the Phi Delta Theta fraternity.

Reynolds had an outstanding freshman year in football. However, he injured his knee in the first game of his sophomore season, and, later that year, lost his spleen and injured his other knee in a bad car accident. He did not return to the university for almost two years. To keep up with his studies, he enrolled at Palm Beach Junior College (PBJC) in neighboring Lake Park in early 1956. When Reynolds returned to Florida State in 1957, he rejoined the football team, although his leg injured in the car accident slowed him down. He was blamed, fairly or not, for the team's loss to North Carolina State on October 12, 1957. Immediately following the game he told his teammates that he was done with football.

Early acting
During his term at PBJC in early 1956, Reynolds was in an English class taught by Watson B. Duncan III. Duncan pushed him into trying out for a play he was producing, Outward Bound. He cast him in the lead role based on having heard him read Shakespeare in class, leading to his winning the 1956 Florida State Drama Award for his performance. "I read two words and they gave me a lead", he later said.

In his autobiography, he referred to Duncan as his mentor and the most influential person in his life.

Career

Theater

The Florida State Drama Award included a scholarship to the Hyde Park Playhouse, a summer stock theater, in Hyde Park, New York. Reynolds saw the opportunity as an agreeable alternative to more physically demanding summer jobs, but did not yet see acting as a possible career. While working there, Reynolds met Joanne Woodward, who helped him find an agent.

"I don't think I ever actually saw him perform", said Woodward later. "I knew him as this cute, shy, attractive boy. He had the kind of lovely personality that made you want to do something for him."

He was cast in Tea and Sympathy at the Neighborhood Playhouse in New York City. After his Broadway debut in Look, We've Come Through, he received favorable reviews for his performance and went on tour with the cast, driving the bus as well as appearing on stage.

After the tour, Reynolds returned to New York and enrolled in acting classes, along with Frank Gifford, Carol Lawrence, Red Buttons and Jan Murray.

"I was a working actor for two years before I finally took my first real acting class (with Wynn Handman at the Neighborhood Playhouse)", he said. "It was a lot of technique, truth, moment-to-moment, how to listen, improv."

After a botched improvisation in acting class, Reynolds briefly considered returning to Florida, but soon gained a part in a revival of Mister Roberts, in which Charlton Heston played the starring role.

After the play closed, the director, John Forsythe, arranged a film audition with Joshua Logan for Reynolds. The film was Sayonara (1957). Reynolds was told he could not be in the film because he looked too much like Marlon Brando. Logan advised Reynolds to go to Hollywood, although Reynolds did not feel confident enough to do so. (Another source says Reynolds did a screen test after studio talent agent Lew Wasserman saw the effect Reynolds had on secretaries in his office but the test was unsuccessful.)

He worked in a variety of jobs, such as waiting tables, washing dishes, driving a delivery truck and as a bouncer at the Roseland Ballroom. Reynolds wrote that, while working as a dockworker, he was offered $150 to jump through a glass window on a live television show.

Early television and Riverboat

Reynolds began acting on television in the late 1950s, guest starring on shows like Flight, M Squad, Schlitz Playhouse, The Lawless Years and Pony Express. He signed a seven-year contract with Universal. "I don't care whether he can act or not", said Wasserman. "Anyone who has this effect on women deserves a break."

Reynolds' first big break came when he was cast alongside Darren McGavin in the lead of the TV series Riverboat (1959–61), playing Ben Frazer. According to a contemporary report, Reynolds was considered "a double for Marlon Brando". The show went for two seasons but Reynolds quit after only 20 episodes, claiming he did not get along with McGavin or the executive producer, and that he had "a stupid part."

Reynolds then said that he "couldn't get a job. I didn't have a very good reputation. You just don't walk out on a network television series."

Reynolds returned to guest starring on television shows. As he put it, "I played heavies in every series in town", appearing in episodes of Playhouse 90, Johnny Ringo, Alfred Hitchcock Presents, Lock Up, The Blue Angels, Michael Shayne, Zane Grey Theater, The Aquanauts and The Brothers Brannagan. "They were depressing years", he later said.

Reynolds made his film debut in the low budget Angel Baby (1961), billed fourth. He followed it with a role in a war film, Armored Command (1961). "It was the one picture that Howard Keel didn't sing on", reminisced Reynolds later. "That was a terrible mistake."

In 1961, he returned to Broadway to appear in Look, We've Come Through, under the direction of José Quintero, but it lasted only five performances.

Reynolds continued to guest star on shows such as Naked City, Ripcord, Everglades, Route 66, Perry Mason, and The Twilight Zone ("The Bard", an hour-long send-up of Reynolds' look-alike Marlon Brando). He later said, "I learned more about my craft in these guest shots than I did standing around and looking virile on Riverboat."

Gunsmoke

In 1962, Dennis Weaver wanted to leave the cast of Gunsmoke, one of the top rated shows in the country. The producers developed a new character, "halfbreed" blacksmith Quint Asper: Reynolds was cast, beating over 300 other contenders. Reynolds announced he would stay on the show "until it ends. I think it's a terrible mistake for an actor to leave a series in the middle of it." Reynolds left Gunsmoke in 1965. He later said that being in that show was "the happiest period of my life. I hated to leave that show but I felt I had served my apprenticeship and there wasn't room for two leading men."

He was cast in his first lead role in a film, the low-budget action film, Operation C.I.A. (1965). He guest starred on Flipper, The F.B.I. and 12 O'Clock High.

Hawk and leading roles in films
Reynolds was given the title role in a TV series, Hawk (1966–67), playing Native American detective John Hawk. It ran for 17 episodes before being cancelled.

He played another Native American in the Spaghetti Western Navajo Joe (1966) shot in Spain. "It wasn't my favorite picture", ...he said later... "I had two expressions—mad and madder."

He guest starred on Gentle Ben and made a pilot for a TV series, Lassiter, where he would have played a magazine journalist. It was not picked up.

Reynolds then made a series of films in quick succession. Shark! (1969), shot in Mexico, was directed by Sam Fuller, who removed his name from it, after which its release was held up for a number of years. Reynolds described Fade In as "the best thing I've ever done", but it was not released for a number of years, and the director, Jud Taylor, took his name off. Impasse (1969) was a war movie shot in the Philippines. He played the title role in Sam Whiskey (1969), a comic Western written by William W. Norton, which Reynolds later said was "way ahead of its time. I was playing light comedy and nobody cared."

Reynolds supported Jim Brown and Raquel Welch in another Western, 100 Rifles (1969), later saying, "I spent the entire time refereeing fights between Jim Brown and Raquel Welch."

In a 1969 interview, he expressed interest in playing roles like the John Garfield part in The Postman Always Rings Twice, but no one gave him those opportunities. "Instead, the producer hands me a script and says 'I know it's not there now kid, but I know we can make it work.'"

Reynolds had been offered a lead role in MASH (1970), but turned it down after "they told me the other two leads would be Barbra Streisand's husband and that tall, skinny guy who was in The Dirty Dozen." Tom Skerritt played the role and Reynolds, instead, went into Skullduggery (1970), shot in Jamaica. Reynolds joked that after making "those wonderful, forgettable pictures... I suddenly realized I was as hot as Leo Gorcey."

Reynolds then starred in two TV films: Hunters Are for Killing (1970) and Run, Simon, Run (1970). In Hunters Are for Killing, his character was originally a Native American, but Reynolds requested this element be changed, feeling he had played that role too many times already, and it was not needed for the character anyway.

Dan August and talk shows

Reynolds played the title character in the police drama Dan August (1970–71), produced by Quinn Martin. The series was given a full-season order of 26 episodes based on the reputation of Martin and Reynolds but struggled in the ratings against Hawaii Five-0 and was not renewed.

Albert R. Broccoli asked Reynolds to take over the role of James Bond from Sean Connery, but he turned that role down, saying, "An American can't play James Bond. It just can't be done."

Following the cancellation of the series, Reynolds did his first stage play in six years, a production of The Tender Trap at Arlington Park Theatre. He was offered other TV pilots but was reluctant to play a detective again.

Around this time, he had become well known as an entertaining talk-show guest, starting with an appearance on The Merv Griffin Show. He made jokes at his own expense, calling himself America's most "well-known unknown" who only made the kind of movies "they show in airplanes or prisons or anywhere else the people can't get out." He proved enormously popular and was frequently asked back by Griffin and Johnny Carson; he even guest hosted the Tonight Show. He was so popular as a guest that he was offered his own talk show but he wanted to continue as an actor.

He later said his talk show appearances were "the best thing that ever happened to me. They changed everything drastically overnight. I spent ten years looking virile, saying, 'Put up your hands.' After the Carson, Griffin, Frost, Dinah's show, suddenly I have a personality."

"I realized that people liked me, that I was enough", said Reynolds. "So if I could transfer that character—the irreverent, self-deprecating side of me, my favorite side of me—onto the screen, I could have a big career.

Deliverance and the centerfold
Reynolds had his breakthrough role in Deliverance, directed by John Boorman, who cast him on the basis of a talk show appearance. "It's the first time I haven't had a script with Paul Newman's and Robert Redford's fingerprints all over it," Reynolds joked. "The producers actually came to me first."

"I've waited 15 years to do a really good movie," he said in 1972. "I made so many bad pictures. I was never able to turn anyone down. The greatest curse in Hollywood is to be a well-known unknown."

Reynolds also gained notoriety around this time when he began a well-publicized relationship with Dinah Shore, who was 20 years his senior, and after he posed naked in the April 1972 issue of Cosmopolitan. Reynolds said he posed for Cosmopolitan for "a kick. I have a strange sense of humor" and because he knew he had Deliverance coming out. He later expressed regret for posing for Cosmopolitan.

Deliverance was a huge commercial and critical success, which, along with talk-show appearances, helped establish Reynolds as a major movie star. "The night of the Academy Awards, I counted a half-dozen Burt Reynolds jokes", he later said. "I had become a household name, the most talked-about star at the award show."

He was then in Fuzz (1972), reuniting him with Welch, and also made a cameo in the Woody Allen film, Everything You Always Wanted to Know About Sex* (*But Were Afraid to Ask) (1972).  He also returned to the stage, appearing in The Rainmaker at the Arlington.

Reynolds had the title role in Shamus (1973), playing a modern-day private eye. The film drew lackluster reviews, but nonetheless became a solid box-office success. Reynolds described it as "not a bad film, kind of cute."

He was in The Man Who Loved Cat Dancing (1973), co-starring Sarah Miles. The film was a minor hit, perhaps best remembered for the scandal of Miles' lover, an aspiring screenwriter, committing suicide during the filming.

Reynolds was meant to reunite with Boorman in Zardoz, but fell ill and was replaced by Sean Connery.

White Lightning
Another turning point in Reynolds' career came when he made the light-hearted car-chase film written by Norton, White Lightning (1973). Reynolds later called it "the beginning of a whole series of films made in the South, about the South and for the South... you could make back the cost of the negative just in Memphis alone. Anything outside of that was just gravy." Car-chase films would be Reynolds' most profitable genre. At the end of 1973, Reynolds was voted into the list of the ten most-popular box-office stars in the US at number four. He would stay on that list until 1984.

He made a sports comedy with Robert Aldrich, The Longest Yard (1974) which was popular. Aldrich later said "I think that on occasion, he's a much better actor than he's given credit for. Not always: sometimes he acts like a caricature of himself."

Reynolds then appeared in two big-budget fiascos: At Long Last Love (1975), a musical for Peter Bogdanovich, and Lucky Lady (1975) with Gene Hackman and Liza Minnelli.

More popular was another light-hearted car-chase film, W.W. and the Dixie Dancekings (1975), and a tough cop drama with Aldrich, Hustle (1975).  He did a cameo for Mel Brooks in Silent Movie (1976).

Director
Reynolds made his directorial debut in 1976 with Gator, the sequel to White Lightning, written by Norton. "I waited 20 years to do it [directing] and I enjoyed it more than anything I've ever done in this business," he said after filming. "And I happen to think it's what I do best."

He was reunited with Bogdanovich for the screwball comedy, Nickelodeon (1976), which was a commercial disappointment. Aldrich later commented, "Bogdanovich can get him to do the telephone book! Anybody else has to persuade him to do something. He's fascinated by Bogdanovich. I can't understand it." He turned down the part of Clark Gable in Gable and Lombard.

Smokey and the Bandit and career peak

Reynolds had the biggest hit of his career with a car-chase film, Smokey and the Bandit (1977), directed by Hal Needham and co-starring Jackie Gleason, Jerry Reed, and Sally Field.

He followed it with a comedy about football players, Semi-Tough (1977), co-starring Jill Clayburgh and Kris Kristofferson and produced by David Merrick. He then directed his second film, The End (1978), a black comedy, playing a role originally written for Woody Allen.

More popular was a car comedy he made with Needham and Field, Hooper (1978), where he played a stuntman.

"My ability as an actor gets a little better every time", he said around this time. "I'm very prolific in the amount of films I make—two-and-a-half or three a year—and when I look at any picture I do now compared to Deliverance, it's miles above what I was doing then. But when you're doing films that are somewhat similar to each other, as I've been doing, people take it for granted."

He turned down the role played by Alan Alda in California Suite (1978) because he felt the part was too small.

He also said, "I'd rather direct than act. I'd rather do that than anything. It's the second-best sensation I've ever had." He added that David Merrick had offered to produce two films Reynolds would direct without having to act in them.

Reynolds tried a change of pace with Starting Over (1979), a romantic comedy, again co-starring Clayburgh and Candice Bergen; it was co-written and produced by James L. Brooks. He played a jewel thief in Rough Cut (1980) produced by Merrick, who fired and then rehired director Don Siegel during filming.

Reynolds had two huge hits with more car films directed by Needham, Smokey and the Bandit II (1980) and The Cannonball Run (1981). He starred in David Steinberg's film Paternity (1981) and directed himself in a tough action film, Sharky's Machine (1981).

Reynolds wanted to try a musical again, and agreed to do The Best Little Whorehouse in Texas (1982). It was a box-office hit, as was Best Friends (1982) with Goldie Hawn. In 1982, Reynolds was voted the most popular star in the US for the fifth year in a row.

Around this time he reflected:
The only thing I really enjoy is this business, and I think my audience knows that. I've never been able to figure out exactly who that audience is. I know there have been a few pictures even my mother didn't go see, but there's always been an audience for them. I guess it is because they always know that I give it 100 percent, and good or bad, there's going to be quite a lot of me in that picture. That's what they're looking for. I don't have any pretensions about wanting to be Hamlet. I would just like to be the best Burt Reynolds around.

Career decline
James L. Brooks offered Reynolds the role of astronaut Garrett Breedlove in Terms of Endearment (1983) but he turned it down to do Stroker Ace (1983), another car-chase comedy directed by Needham. The Endearment role went to Jack Nicholson, who went on to win an Academy Award. Reynolds said in 1987 that "I felt I owed Hal more than I owed Jim" but Stroker Ace flopped.

In 1983, an unnamed producer had said that while Reynolds' salaries would not decline because of Stroker Aces failure, "if two or three more such pictures don't work, people will just stop putting him in that kind of movie and that's the kind of film for which he gets paid the most". Reynolds felt this was a turning point in his career from which he never recovered. "That's where I lost them", he said of his fans.

The Man Who Loved Women (1983), directed by Blake Edwards, also flopped.  In an interview around this time, he said:
Getting to the top has turned out to be a hell of a lot more fun than staying there. I've got Tom Selleck crawling up my back. I'm in my late 40s. I realize I have four or five more years where I can play certain kinds of parts and get away with it. That's why I'm leaning more and more toward directing and producing. I don't want to be stumbling around town doing Gabby Hayes parts a few years from now. I'd like to pick and choose and maybe go work for a perfume factory like Mr. Cary Grant, and look wonderful with everybody saying, 'Gee, I wish he hadn't retired'.
Cannonball Run II (1984), directed by Needham, brought in some money but only half of the original. City Heat (1984), which teamed Reynolds and Eastwood, was mildly popular but was considered a major critical and box-office disappointment. Reynolds was badly injured during filming when he was hit in the jaw with a real chair instead of a breakaway prop, causing him excruciating chronic pain as well as a sharp weight loss which resulted in rumors circulating for years that he had AIDS.

Reynolds returned to directing with Stick (1985), from an Elmore Leonard novel, but it was both a critical and commercial failure. So too were three other action films he made: Heat (1986), based on a William Goldman novel, Malone (1987), and Rent-a-Cop (1987) with Liza Minnelli. He later said that he did Heat and Malone "because there were so many rumors about me [about AIDS]. I had to get out and be seen".

In 1987, Reynolds teamed up with Bert Convy to co-produce the game show Win, Lose or Draw for their production company, Burt and Bert Productions.  The show was based on “sketch pad charades”, a game he often played with his friends in his living room in Jupiter.  Vicki Lawrence hosted the daytime version on NBC while Convy hosted the syndicated version until 1989 when he left to host 3rd Degree, also created by Reynolds and Convy.

Reynolds attempted a screwball comedy, Switching Channels (1989), but it also was a box-office disappointment. Even more poorly received was Physical Evidence (1989), directed by Michael Crichton. Reynolds received excellent reviews for the caper comedy Breaking In (1989), but the commercial reception was poor.

"When I was doing very well," he said at the time, "I wasn't conscious I was doing very well, but I became very conscious when I wasn't doing very well. The atmosphere changed."

Return to TV: BL Stryker and Evening Shade
Reynolds returned to TV series with B.L. Stryker (1989–90). It ran two seasons, during which time Reynolds played a supporting part in Modern Love (1990).

Reynolds then starred in a sitcom, Evening Shade (1990–94) as former Pittsburgh Steelers player Woodward "Wood" Newton. The program was a considerable success, with 98 episodes over four seasons. This role earned him an Emmy Award.  Reynolds credited this role for his membership in Steeler Nation.

During his tenure on Evening Shade, Reynolds was seen in other projects, starting with a cameo in The Player (1992) (playing himself complaining about people in Hollywood).

On August 23, 1993, the children's film Cop & 1/2 premiered, in which Reynolds played the lead. On August 25, the Randy Travis television special Wind in the Wire first aired; Reynolds was among the guests. On October 15, CBS first aired the television film The Man from Left Field, co-starring Reba McEntire. Reynolds starred and directed.

Character actor
When Evening Shade ended, Reynolds played the lead in a horror film, The Maddening (1995). However, he gradually moved into being more of a character actor – he had key support roles in Citizen Ruth (1996), an early work from Alexander Payne, and Striptease (1996) with Demi Moore. He had to audition for the latter. The film's producer later said, "To be honest, we were not enthusiastic at first. There was the hair and his reputation, but we were curious." Reynolds got the role and earned some strong reviews.

Reynolds was a supporting actor in Frankenstein and Me (1996), Mad Dog Time (1996), The Cherokee Kid (1996), Meet Wally Sparks (1997) with Rodney Dangerfield, and Bean (1997) with Rowan Atkinson. He had the lead in Raven (1996), a straight-to-video action film. Around this time he claimed he was broke, having gone through $13 million.

In 1996, Reynolds' agent said "Regarding Burt, there's a split between the executives in town who are under 40 and those who are over 40. The younger executives are more open to Burt because they grew up loving Deliverance. But the older executives remember how crazy he was, and they are less receptive." He also hosted segments for the Encore Action premium cable network in the late 1990s and 2000s.

Boogie Nights and career revival

Reynolds appeared as an adult film director in the hit film Boogie Nights (1997), which was considered a comeback role for him; he received 12 acting awards and three nominations for the role, including a nomination for the Academy Award for Best Supporting Actor, Reynolds' first and only nomination for the award. Reynolds  was offered a role in Boogie Nights writer/director Paul Thomas Anderson's subsequent film, Magnolia (1999), but he declined, saying that he hated working on Boogie Nights and hated Anderson.

He had the lead in Big City Blues (1997) and supporting roles in Universal Soldier II: Brothers in Arms (1998) and Universal Soldier III: Unfinished Business (1998).

Reynolds returned to directing with Hard Time (1998), an action TV film starring himself. It led to two sequels, which he did not direct, Hard Time: The Premonition (1999) and Hard Time: Hostage Hotel (1999) (the latter directed by Hal Needham).

He starred in the straight-to-video The Hunter's Moon (1999), Stringer (1999), and Waterproof (2000). He played supporting roles in Pups (1999) and Mystery, Alaska (1999), and had the lead in The Crew (2000) alongside Richard Dreyfuss.

Reynolds directed The Last Producer (2000), starring himself, and was second-billed in Renny Harlin's Driven (2001), starring Sylvester Stallone. He was also in Tempted (2001), Hotel (2001) (directed by Mike Figgis), and The Hollywood Sign (2001).

He voiced Avery Carrington in Grand Theft Auto: Vice City, released in 2002.

Reynolds was top-billed in Snapshots (2002) with Julie Christie, Time of the Wolf (2002), and Hard Ground (2003), and had supporting roles in Johnson County War (2002) with Tom Berenger, and Miss Lettie and Me (2003) with Mary Tyler Moore.

He was in a series of supporting roles that referred to earlier performances: Without a Paddle (2004), a riff on his role in Deliverance, The Longest Yard (2005), a remake of his 1974 hit with  Adam Sandler playing Reynolds' old role (while Reynolds played the Michael Conrad part from the original); and The Dukes of Hazzard (2005) as Boss Hogg in a nod to his performances in 1970s car-chase films.

Reynolds continued to play lead roles in films such as Cloud 9 (2006), Forget About It (2006), Deal (2008), and A Bunch of Amateurs (2008), and supporting parts in End Game (2006), Grilled (2006), Broken Bridges (2006), In the Name of the King (2007), Not Another Not Another Movie (2011), and Reel Love (2011).

He had a guest role in an episode of Burn Notice, "Past & Future Tense" (2010).

Reynolds voiced himself as the Mayor of Steelport in Saints Row: The Third, released in 2011. Players can recruit Reynolds as a "homie", depending on their in-game choices.

Reynolds also voiced himself in the animated series Archer, in the episode "The Man from Jupiter" (2012). The character of Sterling Archer was largely inspired by Burt Reynolds.

He was top billed in Category 5 (2014) and Elbow Grease (2016) and could be seen in key roles in Pocket Listing (2016), and Hollow Creek (2015). He returned to a regular role on TV in Hitting the Breaks (2016) but it only ran for ten episodes. He was in Apple of My Eye (2016) and took the lead in The Last Movie Star (2017).

Posthumous releases
Reynolds appeared posthumously in the 2019 film An Innocent Kiss as well as in the 2020 film Defining Moments, which includes his final performance.

In May 2018, Reynolds had joined the cast for Quentin Tarantino's film Once Upon a Time in Hollywood as George Spahn (an eighty year old blind man who rented out his ranch to Charles Manson), but he died before shooting his scenes and was later replaced by Bruce Dern.

Author
Reynolds co-authored the 1997 children's book, Barkley Unleashed: A Pirate's Tail, a "whimsical tale [that] illustrates the importance of perseverance, the wonders of friendship and the power of imagination".

Music
In 1973, Reynolds released the country/easy listening album Ask Me What I Am. He also sang in two movie musicals: At Long Last Love (1975) and The Best Little Whorehouse in Texas (1982).

Bankruptcy
Despite his lucrative career, in 1996 he filed for Chapter 11 bankruptcy, due in part to an extravagant lifestyle, a divorce from Loni Anderson and failed investments in some Florida restaurant chains.  Reynolds emerged from bankruptcy two years later.

Personal life

Reynolds in college "was so good-looking, I used him as bait," college roommate Lee Corso recalled. "He'd walk across campus and bring back two girls, one beautiful and one ugly; I got the ugly girl. His ugly girlfriends were better than anyone I could get on my own." Reynolds was married to English actress Judy Carne from 1963 to 1965. He and American singer-actress Dinah Shore (20 years his senior) were in a relationship from early 1971 until 1975. In the mid-1970s, Reynolds briefly dated singer Tammy Wynette. He had a relationship from 1976 to 1980 (then off-and-on until 1982) with American actress Sally Field, during which time they appeared together in four films. In 2016, he regarded Field as the love of his life. Reynolds was married to American actress Loni Anderson from 1988 to 1994. They adopted a son, Quinton. He and Anderson separated after he fell in love with a cocktail waitress, Pam Seals, with whom he later traded lawsuits, which were settled out of court.

In the late 1970s, Reynolds opened Burt's Place, a nightclub restaurant in the Omni International complex in the Hotel District of Downtown Atlanta. He was a lifelong fan of American football, a result of his collegiate career, and was a minority owner of the Tampa Bay Bandits of the USFL from 1982 to 1986. The team's name was inspired by the Smokey and the Bandit trilogy and Skoal Bandit, a primary sponsor for the team as a result of also sponsoring Reynolds' motor racing team.

Reynolds co-owned a NASCAR Winston Cup Series team, Mach 1 Racing, with Hal Needham, which ran the No. 33 Skoal Bandit car with driver Harry Gant. He was awarded an honorary doctorate from Florida State University in 1981 and later endorsed the construction of a new performing arts facility in Sarasota, Florida.

He also owned a private "dinner theater" in Jupiter, Florida, with a focus on training young performers looking to enter show business. The theater was later renamed the Burt Reynolds Jupiter Theater and closed in 1997 after Reynolds declared bankruptcy.

In 1984, he opened a restaurant in Fort Lauderdale, named Burt & Jacks, which he co-owned with Jack Jackson.

While filming City Heat in 1984, Reynolds was struck in the face with a metal chair on the first day of filming, which resulted in temporomandibular joint dysfunction. He was restricted to a liquid diet and lost thirty pounds from not eating. The painkillers he was prescribed led to addiction, which lasted several years. He underwent back surgery in 2009 and a quintuple coronary artery bypass surgery in February 2010.

On August 16, 2011, Merrill Lynch Credit Corporation filed foreclosure papers, claiming Reynolds owed US$1.2 million on his home in Hobe Sound, Florida. Until its sale during bankruptcy, he owned the Burt Reynolds Ranch, where scenes for Smokey and the Bandit were filmed and which once had a petting zoo. In April 2014, the 153-acre (62 ha) rural property was rezoned for residential use and the Palm Beach County school system was empowered to sell it, which it did to the residential developer K. Hovnanian Homes.

Death and tributes
Reynolds died of a heart attack at the Jupiter Medical Center in Jupiter, Florida, on September 6, 2018, at the age of 82. His ex-wife Loni Anderson and their son Quinton held a private memorial service for Reynolds at a funeral home in North Palm Beach, Florida, on September 20. Those in attendance included Sally Field, FSU coach Bobby Bowden, friend Lee Corso, and quarterback Doug Flutie. Reynolds' body was cremated and his ashes were given to his niece, Nancy Lee Brown Hess. He was subsequently interred at Hollywood Forever Cemetery on February 11, 2021. In September 2021, a bronze bust of Reynolds was placed at Hollywood Forever Cemetery.

On the day of Reynolds' death, Antenna TV, which airs The Tonight Show nightly, aired an episode of The Tonight Show Starring Johnny Carson from February 11, 1982, featuring an interview and a This Is Your Life-style skit with Reynolds. The local media in Atlanta and elsewhere in the state noted on their television news programs that evening that he was the first to make major films in Georgia, all of which were successful, which helped make the state one of the top filming locations in the country.  His niece, Nancy Lee Hess, produced a 2020 biography and documentary about Reynolds titled I Am Burt Reynolds.

Legacy and appraisal 
During the height of his career, Reynolds was considered a male sex symbol and icon of American masculinity. Stephen Dalton wrote in The Hollywood Reporter that Reynolds "always seemed to embody an uncomplicated, undiluted, effortlessly likable strain of American masculinity that was driven much more by sunny mischief than angsty machismo." Reynolds' roles were often defined by his larger-than-life physicality and masculinity, contrasted with juvenile but self-aware humor. Though he was not considered a serious dramatic actor during his heyday, his later career was defined by performances that often reflected on his own reputation, creating what Dalton called "sophisticated, soulful performances."

Filmography

Discography
 Ask Me What I Am (1973)

Singles

Awards and nominations

Other honors
 1978: Star on the Hollywood Walk of Fame at 6838 Hollywood Blvd.
 2000: Children at Heart Award
 2003: Atlanta IMAGE Film and Video Award

Works
 Reynolds, Burt. (1994) My Life. New York: Hyperion. 
 Reynolds, Burt. (2015) But Enough About Me: A Memoir. G.P. Putnam's Sons.

See also
Sasha Gabor, adult film star who was a lookalike of Burt Reynolds (as well as of Sean Connery), portraying him (respectively both) in numerous pornographic parody films.

References

Further reading
 Anderson, Loni. (1997) My Life in High Heels. Avon Books. 
 Field, Sally (2018). In Pieces. New York City: Grand Central Publishing. .
  Zeman, Ned.  "Burt Reynolds Isn't Broke, but He's Got a Few Regrets" Vanity Fair, December 2015 – interview and photographs
 "Show Business: Frog Prince". Time. August 21, 1972

External links

 
 
 

1936 births
2018 deaths
20th-century American male actors
21st-century American male actors
American football running backs
American male film actors
American male singers
American male television actors
American male voice actors
American people of Dutch descent
American people of English descent
American people of Scotch-Irish descent
American people of Scottish descent
American people who self-identify as being of Native American descent
Best Musical or Comedy Actor Golden Globe (television) winners
Best Supporting Actor Golden Globe (film) winners
Burials at Hollywood Forever Cemetery
Florida State Seminoles football players
Male actors from Florida
Male actors from Lansing, Michigan
NASCAR team owners
Neighborhood Playhouse School of the Theatre alumni
Outstanding Performance by a Lead Actor in a Comedy Series Primetime Emmy Award winners
Palm Beach State College alumni
People from Hobe Sound, Florida
People from Jupiter, Florida
People from Lake City, Michigan
People from Riviera Beach, Florida
Players of American football from Florida
Players of American football from Michigan
Sportspeople from Lansing, Michigan
United States Football League executives
Western (genre) television actors